Humayun  (Hindi: हुमायूँ) is a 1945 Indian Bollywood historical epic film directed by Mehboob Khan. It was the seventh highest grossing Indian film of 1945.

Cast
Ashok Kumar as Badshah Naseerudin Humayun
Veena  as Rajkumari
Nargis as Hamida Bano
Chandra Mohan as Rajkumar Randhir
Shah Nawaz as Badshah Babar
K.N.Singh as Jai Singh
Himalayawala
Majid
Yusuf Effendi
Abdul Rashid
Abdul Kader
Khurshed Ahmed
Afghan Sandow
Wasker
Mahesher Shirazi
T. M. Mathur

References

External links

 
 Humayun (1945) on indiancine.ma

1945 films
1940s Hindi-language films
Films set in the Mughal Empire
Films directed by Mehboob Khan
Indian historical films
1940s historical films
Indian black-and-white films
Cultural depictions of Indian monarchs